Champignolles is a former commune in the Eure department in northern France. On 1 January 2019, it was merged into the commune La Vieille-Lyre.

Population

See also
Communes of the Eure department

References

Former communes of Eure